Premios Nacionales del Deporte (National Sports Awards) are annual sporting awards given to best Spanish athletes. They are awarded by Consejo Superior de Deportes (CSD) and sponsored by the Spanish Royal Family.

The awards were established in 1982 and are always presented for best achievements in the preceding calendar year. The two most prestigious awards are Premio Reina Sofía for Best Spanish Sportswoman and Premio Don Felipe de Borbón for Best Spanish Sportsman.

List of winners

External links

National sportsperson-of-the-year trophies and awards
Sport in Spain
Spanish awards
Awards established in 1982
1982 establishments in Spain